John T. W. Jennings (Brooklyn, New York City, 1856 to ?) was the Milwaukee Railroad's architect from 1885 to 1893, and was part-time supervising architect for the University of Wisconsin from 1899 to 1906. He contributed to many prominent campus buildings.

List of buildings designed or overseen
 Milwaukee Road depot (1889), Darlington, Wisconsin
 Milwaukee Road Railway depot  (1890), Whitewater, Wisconsin
 University of Wisconsin–Madison King Hall, 1525 Observatory Drive, built in two stages as an expandable design (1894 and 1896)
 University of Wisconsin–Madison Dairy Barn (1897), 1915 Linden Dr. Madison, Wisconsin
 University of Wisconsin–Madison Agricultural Bulletin Building (1899) 
 Janesville Public Library   (1902), S. Main Street, Janesville, Wisconsin
 University of Wisconsin–Madison Agriculture Hall  (1903)
 University of Wisconsin–Madison Engineering Building (Old Education) 
 Dunn County Training and Agricultural School (with Claude and Starck) Menomonie, Wisconsin
 Delafield Fish Hatchery, Main St., Delafield, Wisconsin

References

 Feldman, Jim. The Buildings of the University of Wisconsin–Madison. Madison: University of Wisconsin–Madison Archives, 1997.
 University of Wisconsin–Madison. "The Agricultural District" in Perspectives of a University: A Survey of the Campus Architectural, Historical, Archaeological and Memorial Resources, and Recommendations for Preservation. Madison: Author, 1978, pp. 46–51.

External links
University of Wisconsin–Madison Facility Name Registry

1856 births
American railway architects
Year of death missing
University of Wisconsin–Madison faculty
Architects from Wisconsin